Anne Davaille is a French geophysicist and director of research at the CNRS, France in the field of Earth Sciences.  Davaille is known for her innovative experiments using thermochemical convection in fluids to simulate the mantles of planets. She uses these experiments to analyze fluid mechanics that create a new understanding of convective regimes in Earth and other planets.

Education and career 

Anne Davaille states that her interest in Earth Science was sparked in her childhood by the project FAMOUS scientific exploration. Davaille graduated from ESPCI in 1988. She defended her PhD thesis, Thermal convection in a variable viscosity fluid. Applications to the Earth in 1991, under the supervision of Claude Jaupart at University Paris VI and IPGP.

Davaille is a director of research at the FAST laboratory (Fluides, Automatique et Systèmes Thermiques) of the Université Paris-Sud. Her work focuses on the understanding of fluid mechanics in the mantle of planets, with an emphasis on laboratory experimentation. She has worked extensively on the physics of mantle plumes on Earth  as well as on other rocky planets.

Awards and honors 

Davaille is the recipient of the 2019 Augustus Love medal of the European Geosciences Union for her innovative experiments and analysis of fluid mechanics to understand convective regimes in the mantle and magmatic systems of the Earth and other planets.

In 2019 Anne Davaille was awarded the Augustus Love Medal of the European Geosciences Union “for her experiments and analysis of fluid mechanics to understand convective regimes in the mantle and magmatic systems of Earth and the solar system”. The Augustus Love Medal is “awarded to a distinguished scientist in the field of geodynamics, comprising mantle and core convection, tectonophysics, post-glacial rebound and Earth rotation.”

Research
As a Senior Researcher and Director of Research of the FAST lab at Paris-Sud University, Anne Davaille’s work is centered around fluid mechanics. Her research emphasizes unique laboratory experimentation through innovative and creative ideas. She has done extensive work on the physics of mantle plumes on Earth and other rocky planets (planetary dynamics). Her research has led to new interpretations for the origin of hot spots and superswells as well as isotopic anomalies within the Earth’s mantle.

Some of her highlighted work include studying the onset of small-scale convection beneath the lid of layers with strongly temperature dependent viscosity. Anne has also detailed the existence of a doming regime in fluids above a lower density layer at the base of mantles in rocky planets. She has also introduced new techniques to accurately measure temperatures, compositions, and velocities within fluid masses like that of the mantle Earth. Anne’s work with other rocky planets has contributed to a greater understanding of the onset of subduction on Venus.

References 

French women physicists
French geophysicists
Year of birth missing (living people)
Living people
Research directors of the French National Centre for Scientific Research
ESPCI Paris alumni